Triportheus is a genus of characiform fishes from South America, including Trinidad, ranging from the Rio de la Plata basin to the basins of the Orinoco and Magdalena. Some are migratory.

They somewhat resemble larger, more elongated hatchetfish, including a keeled chest and large pectoral fins. This leads to the common names narrow hatchetfish and elongate hatchetfish, the latter also used more specifically for T. elongatus. Their shape is an adaption for living near the water surface where they find most of their food such as fruits, seeds, leaves, flowers, other plant material, invertebrates (insects, spiders and alike) and occasionally small fish. Seeds eaten by Triportheus are sometimes crushed, but may also pass undamaged through the fish, making them potential seed dispersers.

Species
There are currently 18 recognized species in this genus:

 Triportheus albus Cope, 1872
 Triportheus angulatus (Spix & Agassiz, 1829)
 Triportheus auritus (Valenciennes, 1850)
 Triportheus brachipomus (Valenciennes, 1850)
 Triportheus culter (Cope, 1872)
 Triportheus curtus (Garman, 1890)
 Triportheus elongatus (Günther, 1864) (Elongate hatchetfish)
 Triportheus guentheri (Garman, 1890)
 Triportheus magdalenae (Steindachner, 1878)
 Triportheus nematurus (Kner, 1858)
 Triportheus orinocensis M. C. S. L. Malabarba, 2004
 Triportheus pantanensis M. C. S. L. Malabarba, 2004
 Triportheus paranensis (Günther, 1874) (Tetra)
 Triportheus pictus (Garman, 1890)
 Triportheus rotundatus (Jardine, 1841)
 Triportheus signatus (Garman, 1890)
 Triportheus trifurcatus (Castelnau, 1855)
 Triportheus venezuelensis M. C. S. L. Malabarba, 2004

References

Characiformes genera